This is a list of Chile international footballers born outside their country.

Naturalised players 
According to the current or previous Chilean nationality laws, the following players who were born outside Chile and have played (or have been part of any squad) for Chile national team are considered on two terms about his naturalisation:

 By descent: Players who any of their parents or grandparents are/were Chilean through the principle of jus soli or naturalisation.
 By residence: Players who have kept a permanent residence in Chile.

By descent 
Players in bold are still active, at least at club level.
Caps includes  non A-Class matches.

By residence
Players in bold are still active, at least at club level.
Caps includes non A-Class matches.

Possible cases 
At the beginning, from 1910 to 1913, the Chile National Team squad was made up of Chilean and British citizens, but there is no further information about each player. The following players were probably born in the UK or another country such as Colin Campbell. However, it is possible they were only of British descent:

Goalkeepers:

 Leonard Claude Gibson Yelli (4 caps)
 Pablo Woitas Dorgan (1 cap)
 Roy Lester (1 cap)

Defenders:

 J. MacWilliams (2 caps)
 E. F. Ashe (3 caps)
 Bardie (1 cap)
 Forgie (1 cap)
 Harold Dean (1 cap)

Midfielders:

 Andrés Hoyl (2 caps)
 Henry Allen (3 caps)
 Lewis (1 cap)
 Eickoff (1 cap)

Forwards:

 Frank Simmons (2 caps, 1 goal)
 J. P. Davidson (3 caps)
 Juan H. Hamilton (4 caps)
 Joseph Robson (3 caps)
 Heriberto Sturgess (1 cap)
 Loades (1 cap)
 J. Johnstone (1 cap)
 Alexander Skewes (1 cap)

References 

Football in Chile
Footballers in Chile
Chile
Chile
Association football player non-biographical articles